William Thoburn (December 3, 1906 – June 20, 1997) was a Canadian rower who competed in the 1932 Summer Olympics. He was born in Dundas, Ontario. In 1932 he was a crew member of the Canadian boat which won the bronze medal in the Olympic eights event. At the 1930 Empire Games he won the bronze medal with the Canadian boat in the eights competition.

References

External links
William Thoburn's profile at Sports Reference.com
William Thoburn's obituary

1906 births
1997 deaths
Rowers from Hamilton, Ontario
Canadian male rowers
Olympic rowers of Canada
Rowers at the 1932 Summer Olympics
Olympic bronze medalists for Canada
Rowers at the 1930 British Empire Games
Commonwealth Games bronze medallists for Canada
Olympic medalists in rowing
Medalists at the 1932 Summer Olympics
Commonwealth Games medallists in rowing
Medallists at the 1930 British Empire Games